The following is a list of football stadiums in Japan, ordered by capacity. All stadiums with a capacity of 5,000 or more are included.

Defunct Stadiums

See also 
 List of Asian stadiums by capacity
 List of association football stadiums by capacity
 List of sports venues in Japan
 List of baseball stadiums in Japan

References

External links
 Stadiums in Japan - World Stadiums

Stadiums
Football stadiums
Japan